This is a list of official neighborhoods in Louisville, Kentucky.  Like many older American cities, Louisville has well-defined neighborhoods, many with well over a century of history as a neighborhood.

The oldest neighborhoods are the riverside areas of Downtown and Portland (initially a separate settlement), representing the early role of the river as the most important form of commerce and transportation. As the city expanded, peripheral neighborhoods like Butchertown, Phoenix Hill, Russell, Shelby Park, Smoketown and others were developed to house and employ the growing population.

The arrival of the streetcar allowed suburbs to be built further out, such as Beechmont, Belknap, Old Louisville, Shawnee and the Highlands. An interurban rail line in the early 1900s led to communities east of Louisville such as Anchorage and Glenview becoming year-round homes for the rich. Some of Louisville's very rich also moved to mansions along Alta Vista road, in today's Cherokee-Seneca neighborhood.

Pre-merger

Unincorporated places 

After merger, unincorporated census designated places in Jefferson County were considered by many (local media for example) to have become neighborhoods of Louisville.

Select unincorporated places, most of which were previously considered CDPs (census-designated places), are:

Other unincorporated places include:

Incorporated places 

After merger, incorporated places in Jefferson County became a part of Louisville while retaining their respective small city governments. Most of these small cities are considered neighborhoods of Louisville although the neighborhood boundaries are not necessarily contiguous with the boundaries of the small cities. Listed under St. Matthews are former cities it annexed and thus are now included as its neighborhoods.

Designated as neighborhoods 

Some attractions and areas in Louisville are officially designated as neighborhoods.

 Bowman Field
 Fairgrounds
 University of Louisville (Belknap Campus)

See also 

 Cityscape of Louisville, Kentucky
 Geography of Louisville, Kentucky
 List of parks in the Louisville metropolitan area

Further reading

External links 
 HomeTownLocator Jefferson County, Kentucky
 Kentuckiana Regional Planning and Development Agency
 Louisville neighborhood associations listed on Neighborhood Link
 A Place in Time: The story of Louisville's neighborhoods (The Courier-Journal)
 Map of Urban Neighborhoods (Adobe PDF)